Utica is a town in Utica Township, Clark County, Indiana, United States. The population was 776 at the 2010 census.

History
From 1794 to 1825, Utica was a popular ferry crossing, as ferry crossings were considered too dangerous at Jeffersonville, due to inexperienced ferry operators and the Falls of the Ohio. James Noble Wood, the founder of Utica, was the first ferryman in the area, and he served as one of only a handful of territorial judges in "Indian Territory" during this period.

After a flood in 1997, Utica grew because it was required to strengthen its building, planning, and zoning laws in order to obtain Federal Emergency Management Agency (FEMA) and Indiana DNR rebuilding funds. However, Utica is unlikely to see much more growth due to being surrounded by the Port of Indiana – Jeffersonville, a new I-265 bridge over the Ohio River at Utica (complete late 2016), and the River Ridge Commerce Center.

Geography
Utica is located at  (38.334556, -85.654961).

Demographics

2010 census
As of the census of 2010, there were 776 people, 328 households, and 212 families living in the town. The racial makeup of the town was 89.6% White, 3.4% African American, 0.8% Native American, 1.9% Asian, 1.9% from other races, and 2.4% from two or more races. Hispanic or Latino of any race were 3.4% of the population.

There were 328 households, of which 29.3% had children under the age of 18 living with them, 48.5% were married couples living together, 10.7% had a female householder with no husband present, 5.5% had a male householder with no wife present, and 35.4% were non-families. 28.7% of all households were made up of individuals, and 6.7% had someone living alone who was 65 years of age or older. The average household size was 2.37 and the average family size was 2.88.

The median age in the town was 43.3 years. 19.3% of residents were under the age of 18; 7.4% were between the ages of 18 and 24; 25.4% were from 25 to 44; 33.7% were from 45 to 64; and 14.2% were 65 years of age or older. The gender makeup of the town was 47.7% male and 52.3% female.

2000 census

As of the census of 2000, there were 591 people, 254 households, and 164 families living in the town. The racial makeup of the town was 97.63% White, 1.02% African American, 0.17% Native American, 0.34% Asian, 0.51% from other races, and 0.34% from two or more races. Hispanic or Latino of any race were 1.18% of the population.

There were 254 households, out of which 23.2% had children under the age of 18 living with them, 50.0% were married couples living together, 9.8% had a female householder with no husband present, and 35.4% were non-families. 30.7% of all households were made up of individuals, and 11.4% had someone living alone who was 65 years of age or older. The average household size was 2.33 and the average family size was 2.85.

In the town, the population was spread out, with 21.0% under the age of 18, 6.8% from 18 to 24, 23.9% from 25 to 44, 33.0% from 45 to 64, and 15.4% who were 65 years of age or older. The median age was 44 years. For every 100 females, there were 87.0 males. For every 100 females age 18 and over, there were 92.2 males.

The median income for a household in the town was $36,023, and the median income for a family was $38,750. Males had a median income of $35,156 versus $19,821 for females. The per capita income for the town was $23,518. About 5.3% of families and 8.1% of the population were below the poverty line, including 6.7% of those under age 18 and 19.4% of those age 65 or over.

References

Towns in Clark County, Indiana
Towns in Indiana
Louisville metropolitan area
Indiana populated places on the Ohio River